Kein Einaste (born February 22, 1985 in Pärnu) is an Estonian cross-country skier who has competed since 2004. His best World Cup finish was 7th in a sprint event in Otepää in January 2010. At the 2010 Winter Olympics in Vancouver, he finished 59th (after a crash in a prologue) in the men's sprint.

References

External links

1985 births
Cross-country skiers at the 2010 Winter Olympics
Estonian male cross-country skiers
Living people
Olympic cross-country skiers of Estonia
Sportspeople from Pärnu